Hubert Bourdot (30 October 1861 – 30 September 1937) was a French Roman Catholic priest and mycologist who was a native of Imphy, a community in the department of Nièvre.

From 1898 until his death, Bourdot was a parish priest in Saint-Priest-en-Murat. He was a member of the Société mycologique de France, serving as its vice-president in 1919, and later becoming an honorary president (1929). He bequeathed his mycological collection to the Museum National d'Histoire Naturelle in Paris.

With mycologist Amédée Galzin (1853–1925), he was co-author of a series of publications (1909–1925) involving Hymenomycetes native to France (published in the Bulletin de la Société Mycologique de France).

Selected publications 
 Hyménomycètes de France: I. Heterobasidiés, 1909
 Hyménomycètes de France: II. Homobasidiés: Clavariés et Cyphellés, 1910
 Hyménomycètes de France: III. Corticiées: Corticium, Epithele, Asterostromella, 1911
 Hyménomycètes de France: IV. Corticiées: Vuilleminia, Aleurodiscus, Dendrothele, Gloeocystidium, Peniophora, 1912
 Hyménomycètes de France: V. Hydnées, 1914
 Hyménomycètes de France: VI. Asterostromés, 1920
 Hyménomycètes de France: VII. Stereum, 1921
 Hyménomycètes de France: VIII. Hymenochaete, 1923
 Hyménomycètes de France: IX. Meruliés, 1923
 Hyménomycètes de France. X. Phylactèriés, 1924
 Hyménomycètes de France, XI., 1925
 Heterobasidiae nondum descriptae, 1924 (descriptions of a few jelly fungi), with Galzin in: Bulletin de la Société Mycologique de France. 
 Contribution à la Flore Mycologique de la France: I. Hyménomycètes de France. Hétérobasidiés-Homobasidiés Gymnocarpes'', with Galzin (761 pp.), 1927.

References 
 Selection of Publications of Hubert Bourdot @ Mushroom Journal
 Biographies of Leading Mycologists, translated from French

French mycologists
People from Nièvre
1861 births
1937 deaths